National Highway 383, commonly called NH 383 is a national highway in  India. It is a spur road of National Highway 83. NH-383 traverses the state of Tamil Nadu in India. The route of national highway has been extended from Kottampatty to Karaikudi.

Route 
Dindigul, Kosavapatti, Sanarpatti, Gopalpatti, Natham, Samuthirapatti, Kottampatty, Tiruppathur, Karaikkudi.

Junctions  
 
  Terminal near Dindigul.
  near Natham.
  near Kottampatty.
  Terminal near Karaikudi.

See also 
 List of National Highways in India by highway number
 List of National Highways in India by state

References

External links 

 NH 383 on OpenStreetMap

National highways in India
National Highways in Tamil Nadu